Cyanolichens are lichens that apart from the basic fungal component ("mycobiont"), contain cyanobacteria, otherwise known as blue-green algae, as the photosynthesizing component ("photobiont").  Overall, about a third of lichen photobionts are cyanobacteria and the other two thirds are green algae.

Some lichens contain both green algae and cyanobacteria apart from the fungal component, in which case they are called "tripartite".  Normally the photobiont occupies an extensive layer covering much of the thallus, but in tripartite lichens, the cyanobacterium component may be enclosed in pustule-like outgrowths of the main thallus called cephalodia, which can take many forms.  Apart from gaining energy through photosynthesis, the cyanobacteria which live in cephalodia may perform nitrogen fixation on behalf of the lichen community.  These cyanobacteria are generally more rich in nitrogen-fixing cells called heterocysts than those which live in the main photobiont layer of lichens.

External links
Lichens of North America, by I. Brodo, S. Sharnoff and S.D. Sharnoff

References

Lichenology